Mombasa Sports Club (MSC) is multi-sport club based in Mombasa, Kenya. It also owns sporting facilities. The club was established in 1896, and it is among the oldest sporting clubs in Kenya.

Cricket 
Mombasa Sports Club has a cricket team taking part in the  Coast Cricket Association competitions.

Cricket ground 
The Mombasa Sports Club ground is the only fully accredited ODI Cricket ground in Kenya outside of Nairobi. Its acquired this status prior to hosting a three match ODI series between Kenya and Bermuda as well as a triangular ODI Tournament featuring Kenya, Canada and Scotland, in 2006. Providing all the cricket for Ireland's tour of the country in 2012, this venue has hosted fifteen international fixtures (twelve ODI and three T20I), also six first-class matches (initially in 1964) and 22 List A matches.

Hockey 
The club has field hockey sections for men and women. In 2008, MSC ladies team plays in 1st level National league, while their men counterparts play in the premier league.
In 2011, the Men's team finishes a top their National League and get promoted to the Premier League.
In 2012, in their first year, they finish 9th out of 12 teams and ensure Kenya Hockey Premier League survival for the 2013 Season ahead of regulars; Mvita XI, Karate Axiom and Western Jaguars.
The 2013 Season Kicks Off with the Mombasa Derby, MSC vs Mvita XI on 8 June 2013, before a flurry of four matches against: Western Jaguars, Green Sharks, Kenya Police and Strathmore

Rugby 
MSC Rugby team plays in the Kenya Cup league, the highest level rugby union competition in Kenya. The club started playing rugby in 1935. The MSC Rugby Grounds, most recently hosted the Confederation of African Rugby tournament that brought together Over 8 national teams to a qualifier tournament in Mombasa, among them, Zimbabwe, Namibia and Morocco

Football 
Their football team takes part in regional level football competitions.

Other sports 
Other disciplines at Mombasa Sports Club include Basketball, Squash, Snooker, Tennis, Bowling and Bridge.

List of Centuries

One Day Internationals

List of Five Wicket Hauls

One Day Internationals

References 

Mombasa Sports Club
Cricinfo ground profile 
Google map location 
Hockey Kenya
Kenya Rugby Union

External links 
Mombasa Sports Club homepage

Kenyan club cricket teams
Cricket grounds in Kenya
Kenyan rugby union teams
Kenyan field hockey clubs
Football clubs in Kenya
Sport in Mombasa
1896 establishments in Kenya
Sports clubs established in 1896